The Scarab STM is a 3-wheeled car designed and manufactured in the United States of America beginning in 1976.

History
The Scarab STM was manufactured by Fiberfab, a company founded by Warren "Bud" Goodwin. The "STM" in the name stands for "Sport Transport Module". The vehicle is a reverse trike design utilizing VW Beetle front suspension married to a rear motorcycle running gear. The Scarab STM is among the rarest of Fiberfab's models, with reports that only six were ever produced.

Although photos of a prototype Scarab STM showed gull-wing doors, the production models did not use them. Instead, access to the interior was gained by lifting the vehicle's roof canopy up and forward.

References

Three-wheeled motor vehicles